The Brito Formation is a geologic formation in Honduras. It preserves fossils dating back to the Late Eocene period.

Fossil content 
 Astrocoenia dachiardii
 Syzygophyllia hayesi

See also 
 List of fossiliferous stratigraphic units in Honduras

References

Further reading 
 T. W. Vaughan. 1919. Fossil corals from Central America, Cuba, and Porto Rico, with an account of the American Tertiary, Pleistocene, and Recent coral reefs. Smithsonian Institution Bulletin 103:189–524

Geologic formations of Nicaragua
Paleogene Nicaragua
Limestone formations
Marl formations
Shallow marine deposits
Rivas Department